Kokatahi is a locality on the West Coast of New Zealand. Hokitika is about 15 km to the north-west. The Kokatahi River flows through the area and into the Hokitika River to the north-west.

Farming in the area started in the late 1860s to produce oats and vegetables to feed the gold rush miners and their horses. In 1900-1901 a dairy factory opened at Kokatahi.

Education

Police shootings
On 4 October 1941, Stanley Graham went on a shooting rampage after a neighbour of Graham's, Anker Madsen, complained to Constable Edward Best, stationed in nearby Kaniere, that Graham was accusing him of poisoning his cattle. Best decided not to respond in order to give Graham time to calm himself.

Best later returned with additional policeman and tried to disarm Graham. In the process Graham then shot and killed four policeman.

Graham was later shot dead on 17 October 1941 after a massive police manhunt lead by Commissioner of Police Denis Cummings.

Notes

Westland District
Populated places in the West Coast, New Zealand